Aporo may refer to:
 Aporo Municipality, Michoacán, Mexico
 Aporo, Michoacán, Mexico
 Timana James Aporo Tahu (born 1980), rugby league player
 Aporo (song), song by Greek musician Yiannis Parios